This is a list of mayors (alcaldes) of El Puerto de Santa María.

Mayors of El Puerto de Santa María 

 Francisco Gil de Partearroyo y Martinez de la Arena
 Francisco Puente y Jiménez
 José L. de la Cuesta y Aldaz
 Joaquín Ruiz y López
 José María Heredia y Ferrer
 Joaquín Ruiz López
 Manuel Ruiz-Calderón y Paz
 José María Heredia y Ferrer
 Luis Portillo de Pineda
 Manuel Ruiz-Calderón y Paz
 Ramón Varela Campos
 Manuel Ruiz-Calderón Paz
 Ernesto S. Piury Dagnino
 Antonio Gutiérrez Gómez
 Manuel Ruiz-Calderón y Paz
 Luis Portillo de Pineda
 Sebastián Péndola y Soto
 Alfonso Sancho y Mateos
 José L. de la Cuesta Aldaz
 Eduardo Ruiz Golluri
 Francisco Cossi Ochoa
 Francisco Tomeu Navarro
 Francisco Cossi Ochoa
 Francisco Tomeu Navarro
 José Luis Macías Caro
 Ramón García Llano
 Francisco Veneroni Arcos
 José Blandino Mitjes
 Manuel Fernández Moro
 Fernando Ristori
 Ramón Iribarren Jiménez
 Ángel Guinea de León Garavito
 Francisco Quijano Rosende
 Antonio Rives Bret
 Manuel Barba Ordóñez
 José María Pastor Moreno
 Fernando C. de Terry y del Cuvillo
 Ignacio Osborne Vázquez
 Joaquín Calero Cuenca
 Eduardo Ciria Pérez
 Luis Caballero Noguera
 Miguel Castro Merello
 Luis Portillo Ruiz
 Juan Melgarejo Osborne
 Fernando T. de Terry Galarza
 Manuel Martínez Alfonso
 Francisco Javier Merello Gaztelu
 Enrique Pedregal Valenzuela
 Antonio Álvarez Herrera
 Rafael Gómez Ojeda
 Juan Manuel Torres Ramírez
 Hernán Díaz Cortés
 Fernando Gago García
 Enrique Moresco García

References 

El Puerto de Santa María
El Puerto de Santa Maria